The United Nations Fish Stocks Agreement (UNFSA), otherwise known as the Straddling Fish Stocks Agreement (formally, the Agreement for the Implementation of the Provisions of the United Nations Convention on the Law of the Sea of 10 December 1982 relating to the Conservation and Management of Straddling Fish Stocks and Highly Migratory Fish Stocks) is a multilateral treaty created by the United Nations to enhance the cooperative management of fisheries resources that span wide areas, and are of economic and environmental concern to a number of nations. As of December 2016, the treaty had been ratified by 91 parties, which includes 90 states and the European Union.

Straddling stock are fish stocks that migrate through, or occur in, more than one exclusive economic zone. The Agreement was adopted in 1995, and came into force in 2001.

Highly migratory fish is a term which has its origins in the United Nations Convention on the Law of the Sea. It refers to fish species which undertake ocean migrations and also have wide geographic distributions, and usually denotes tuna and tuna-like species, shark, marlin and swordfish. Straddling fish stocks are especially vulnerable to overexploitation because of ineffective management regimes and noncompliance by fishing interests.

See also

 Fisheries management
 Admiralty law

Notes

References
 United Nations Conference on Straddling Fish Stocks and Highly Migratory Fish Stocks
 The Quest for Sustainable International FisheriesRegional Efforts to Implement the 1995 United Nations Fish Stocks Agreement: An Overview for the May 2006 Review Conference

External links
 Procedural history and related documents on the United Nations Fish Stocks Agreement in the Historic Archives of the United Nations Audiovisual Library of International Law

2001 in the environment
Fisheries treaties
United Nations treaties
Treaties concluded in 1996
Treaties entered into force in 2001
Treaties of Bangladesh
Treaties of Chile
Treaties of Ecuador
Treaties of Morocco
Treaties of Saint Vincent and the Grenadines
Treaties of Nigeria
Treaties of Indonesia
Treaties of Tuvalu
Treaties of Panama
Treaties of Mozambique
Treaties of Slovakia
Treaties of Hungary
Treaties of Oman
Treaties of Palau
Treaties of South Korea
Treaties of Romania
Treaties of the Czech Republic
Treaties of Lithuania
Treaties of Latvia
Treaties of Bulgaria
Treaties of Niue
Treaties of Trinidad and Tobago
Treaties of Japan
Treaties of Estonia
Treaties of Slovenia
Treaties of Poland
Treaties of Liberia
Treaties of Guinea
Treaties of Kiribati
Treaties of Belize
Treaties of Kenya
Treaties of Sweden
Treaties of Spain
Treaties of Portugal
Treaties of the Netherlands
Treaties of Italy
Treaties of Luxembourg
Treaties of Ireland
Treaties of Greece
Treaties of Germany
Treaties of France
Treaties of Finland
Treaties of Denmark
Treaties of Belgium
Treaties of Austria
Treaties entered into by the European Union
Treaties of India
Treaties of South Africa
Treaties of the Marshall Islands
Treaties of Ukraine
Treaties of the United Kingdom
Treaties of Malta
Treaties of Costa Rica
Treaties of New Zealand
Treaties of Barbados
Treaties of Brazil
Treaties of Australia
Treaties of Uruguay
Treaties of Canada
Treaties of Monaco
Treaties of Papua New Guinea
Treaties of the Cook Islands
Treaties of the Maldives
Treaties of Iran
Treaties of Namibia
Treaties of Seychelles
Treaties of Russia
Treaties of the Federated States of Micronesia
Treaties of Mauritius
Treaties of Iceland
Treaties of the Solomon Islands
Treaties of Senegal
Treaties of the Bahamas
Treaties of Nauru
Treaties of Norway
Treaties of Fiji
Treaties of Samoa
Treaties of Sri Lanka
Treaties of the United States
Treaties of Saint Lucia
Treaties of Tonga
Treaties of Cyprus
Treaties of Croatia
Treaties of the Philippines
1996 in New York City
Treaties extended to the Faroe Islands
Treaties extended to Greenland
Treaties extended to Anguilla
Treaties extended to Bermuda
Treaties extended to the British Indian Ocean Territory
Treaties extended to the British Virgin Islands
Treaties extended to the Falkland Islands
Treaties extended to South Georgia and the South Sandwich Islands
Treaties extended to the Pitcairn Islands
Treaties extended to the Turks and Caicos Islands
Fish migrations